A dogcart is a cart pulled by one or more drafting dogs.

Description
Dog carts pulled by two or more dogs were historically used in Belgium and the Netherlands for delivering milk, bread, and other trades. In early Victorian Britain, dogcarts were associated with bakers, and when they used the area reserved for pedestrians, were considered a nuisance. Dog-drawn carts were prohibited in London in 1840, but some still exist (mainly for reasons of novelty) in France and Belgium for delivering churns of milk from small farms to the dairy.  

Carts pulled by a single dog were sometimes used by peddlers. Dogs were used as draught animals during the World War I to pull small field guns. Dogs were used by the Soviet Army in World War II to pull carts containing a stretcher for wounded soldiers.

The modern-day sport of carting is an entertainment involving large dogs pulling carts. Compare dog sled, in which a team of dogs pull over snow or ice.

See also
A Dog of Flanders
Dog travois
Drafting Dog

References

External links

Dog Training Tips

Carts
Dog equipment